The PN-3 Isamaa Päästja - (Savior of the Fatherland in Estonian), was an Estonian fighter and surveillance aircraft.

Design
The series was planned with retractable landing gear, but the prototype was built with fixed landing gear for economy and to speed up development. The start of World War II and Soviet occupation of Estonia interrupted the PN-3 program, and it never reached mass production. The armament of the PN-3 was to have consisted of two  machine guns.

Service history
Just one prototype was finished and delivered to the Estonian Air Force, later being used as a trainer. After Estonia was occupied by the USSR in 1940, the single prototype was used for target practice.

Specifications (PN-3)

References

Aircraft first flown in 1939
Aviotehas PN-3
1930s Estonian fighter aircraft
Single-engined tractor aircraft